The following list is a discography of production (songwriting and arrangement) and sole songwriting credits (excluding guest appearances, interpolations, and samples) by The-Dream.

Production credits
3LW – "You Ain't Ready" (produced with Tricky Stewart)
Beyoncé
"Single Ladies (Put a Ring on It)" (produced with Tricky Stewart)
"Smash Into You"
"1+1"
"Run the World (Girls)"
"End of Time"
"Yoncé" / "Partition" (produced with Timbaland, Jerome Harmon, Key Wane, Mike Dean and Boots)
"XO" (produced with Ryan Tedder and Hit-Boy)
"Flawless" (featuring Chimamanda Ngozi Adichie) (produced with Hit-Boy and Rey Reel Music)
"Break My Soul" (produced with Tricky Stewart)
Cassie
 "Nobody But You"
 "I'm a Lover" (produced with Tricky Stewart)
Ciara
 Fantasy Ride (2009)
 "High Price" featuring Ludacris (produced with Tricky Stewart)
 "Like a Surgeon" (produced with Tricky Stewart)
 "Lover's Thing" featuring The-Dream (Co-produced)
 "Keep Dancin' On Me" (produced with Tricky Stewart)
Basic Instinct (2010)
 "Basic Instinct (U Got Me)" (produced with Tricky Stewart)
 "Ride" featuring Ludacris (produced with Tricky Stewart)
 "Girls Get Your Money" (produced with Tricky Stewart)
 "Speechless" (produced with Tricky Stewart)
 "You Can Get it" (produced with Tricky Stewart)
 "Wants For Dinner" (produced with Tricky Stewart)
 "I Run it" (produced with Tricky Stewart)
Diddy – "Change"
Donnie Klang – "Hurt That Body"
 Flo Rida – "Respirator"  (produced with Los Da Mystro)
Electrik Red – "So Good" (produced with Tricky Stewart)
Jamie Foxx
 (featuring T.I.) "Just Like Me" (produced with Tricky Stewart)
 (featuring Kanye West & The-Dream) "Digital Girl" (produced with Tricky Stewart)
Janet Jackson – "The Greatest X" (produced with Tricky Stewart)
Jay-Z 
 (feat. Justin Timberlake) "Holy Grail" (produced with Timbaland, No ID and Jerome "J-Roc" Harmon)
Justin Bieber – "Baby" (produced with Tricky Stewart)
Keyshia Cole – "Finally"
Lionel Richie – "Forever and a Day" (produced with Tricky Stewart)
Mariah Carey
 "Touch My Body"  (produced with Tricky Stewart) 
 "Obsessed" (produced with Tricky Stewart)
 "H.A.T.E.U." (produced with Tricky Stewart)
 "They Don't Know Me" (Unreleased) (produced with Tricky Stewart
Mary J. Blige
 ''Stronger with Each Tear"
 "Kitchen  (produced with Tricky Stewart) 
Mario – "Starlight"
Nivea
 "Intro: Rain"
 "Complicated"
 "Fulton County Correctional Call (Interlude)"
 "Breathe (Let It Go)" (Co-Producer)
 "Indian Dance"
 "Okay (Red-Cup Version)"
 "It's All Good"
Rihanna
"Umbrella" (produced with Tricky Stewart)
"Whipping My Hair" (produced with Tricky Stewart)
"Hard" (produced with Tricky Stewart)
"Rockstar 101" (produced with Tricky Stewart)
"Birthday Cake" (produced with Da Internz)
"Do Ya Thang" (produced with Kuk Harell)
"Phresh Out the Runway" (produced with David Guetta and Giorgio Tuinfort)
"Nobody's Business" (featuring Chris Brown) (produced with Carlos McKinney)
"Love Without Tragedy / Mother Mary" (produced with Carlos McKinney)
Rita Ora
"Hello, Hi, Goodbye"
Taurus
"Learn the Hard Way"
Tulisa
"Sight of You"
The Cheetah Girls
Fuego
Homesick
Dance Me If You Can
Feels Like Love
Kim Kardashian
"Jam (Turn It Up)"

Writing credits
3LW – "You Ain't Ready"
Ashanti – "Medicine"
B2K – "Everything"
Bayje
 "Still in Love"
 "Missin' You"
Beyoncé
 "Single Ladies (Put A Ring On It)"
 "Smash Into You"
 "1 + 1"
 "Love on Top"
 "Countdown"
 "End of Time"
 "Run the World (Girls)"
 "Dance For You"
"Yoncé" / "Partition"
"XO" 
 "Flawless"
"Savage Remix"
"I'm That Girl"
"Cozy"
"Cuff It"
"Energy" (feat. BEAM)
"Break My Soul"
"Church Girl"
"Thique"
"All Up In Your Mind"
"America Has a Problem"
"Pure/Honey"
"Summer Renaissance"
Boss – "Butterfly Effect"
Billy Crawford – "Bright Lights Big City"
Brit and Alex
 "Beautiful"
 "Heart Breaker"
 "Preachin' to the Choir"
 "That's My Baby"
Britney Spears – "Me Against the Music" (feat. Madonna)
Brooke Valentine – "Ghetto Superstarz"
Celine Dion – "Skies of L.A."
Chris Brown – "You"
Ciara
 "Ciara To The Stage"
 "High Price"
 "Like A Surgeon"
 "Keep Dancing" (feat. The-Dream)
 "Lover's Thing" (feat. The-Dream)
Dear Jayne
 "Talkin' 'Bout Himself"
 "I Loose Everything"
Diddy – "Change"
J. Holiday
 "Bed"
 "Laa Laa"
 "Suffocate"
Jamie Foxx
 "Just Like Me (feat. T.I.)"
 "Slow"
 "Rainman"
 "Why"
 "Digital Girl (feat. Kanye West)"
Janet Jackson – "Greatest X"
Jay-Z – "Holy Grail" (feat. Justin Timberlake)
Jennifer Lopez – "Louboutins"
Jesse McCartney
 "Leavin"
 "Undo"
Jessie J - "Loud" (feat. Lindsey Stirling)
Jon McLaughlin – "Smack Into You"
Justin Bieber
 "One Time"
 "Baby" (feat. Ludacris)
Karina Pasian – "16 @ War"
Lindsay Lohan
 "Washing My Hands"
 "Problem Solver (Call Me)"
Lloyd
 "I Need Love"
Lucy Walsh
 "Forever Since"
 "So Uncool"
Mario – "Crazy Kind of Love"
Mariah Carey
 "Touch My Body"
 "Touch My Body (remix)" (featuring The-Dream)
 "Betcha Gon' Know (The Prologue)"
 "Obsessed"
 "H.A.T.E. U"
 "Candy Bling"
 "Ribbon"
 "Standing O"
 "Inseparable"
 "Up Out My Face"
 "More Than Just Friends"
 "The Impossible"
 "They Don't Know Me (Unreleased)"
 "I Need Things"
Mary J. Blige
 "Grown Woman" (feat. Ludacris)
 "Just Fine"
 "Feel Like a Woman"
 "Shake Down" (feat. Usher)
 "Roses"
 "Come to Me (Peace)"
 "Nowhere Fast"
 "Mirror" (feat. Eve)
 "Kitchen"
Mýa – "Like Crazy"
Nicole Scherzinger – "Powers Out" (feat. Sting)
Nivea
 "Complicated"
 "I Can't Mess with You"
 "Indian Dance"
 "Let It Go"
 "Okay" (feat. Lil Jon & YoungBloodZ)
 "Red Cup" (feat. The-Dream)
 "Watch It"
Raheem DeVaughn – "Customer"
Rihanna
 "Breakin' Dishes"
 "Lemme Get That"
 "Sell Me Candy"
 "Umbrella"
 "Hatin' On The Club"
 "Hard" (featuring Jeezy)
 "Rockstar 101" (featuring Slash)
 "Birthday Cake"
 "Red Lipstick"
 "Do Ya Thang"
 "Phresh Out the Runway"
 "Right Now" (featuring David Guetta)
 "Nobody's Business" (featuring Chris Brown)
 "Love Without Tragedy / Mother Mary"
Rita Ora – "Roc The Life"
Shawn Desman
 "No More"
 "Man in Me"
 "Ooh"
Steph Jones – "La La Means Love"
Sterling Simms – "All I Need"
Sugababes – "Gotta Be You"
The Carters
 "Salud"
T.I.
 "No Mercy"
Taurus – "I Need Your Lovin'"
Usher
 "Moving Mountains"
 "This Ain't Sex"
 "Trading Places"
Yung Joc – "Coffee Shop" (feat. Gorilla Zoe)
Kim Kardashian – "Jam (Turn It Up)"

See also
The-Dream discography

References

External links
 
 
 

Discographies of American artists
Hip hop discographies
Rhythm and blues discographies
Production discographies